The School for Deaf and Mute (Tajik: Мактаби кару гунгхо / Maktabi karu gungho) is a special art and social sciences school in Dushanbe for students with limited hearing and speaking ability. It was founded on January 17, 1975, when Tajikistan was a part of the Soviet Union. It is currently located on 44 Karaboyev Street, in Dushanbe.

The school has 13 classrooms, a library, the director's office, offices for the director's assistants, and a computer lab. There are 15 teachers and a student body of 135. The school's current director is Rafik S. H. Odinev. Lessons are four days per week for grades 1 through 9 and 2 days per week for grades 10–12.

On the educational staff, there are a speech therapist, a sign-language interpreter and a methodologist. Since the year 2004, there have been computer classes sponsored by the US State Department and implemented by Relief International Schools Online, with 9 computers, a printer and Internet access. Ms. K. D. Giyoyeva works as the teacher in the Internet Center.

External links

Relief International
Schools Online

Special schools in Tajikistan
Schools in Tajikistan
Schools for the deaf
Education in Dushanbe
Educational institutions established in 1975
1975 establishments in Tajikistan